The Shahi Mosque is the main mosque in the town of Chitral, Khyber Pakhtunkhwa, Pakistan. It is located on the bank of the Chitral river adjacent to the Chitral Fort. It was the principal mosque of Chitral at the time of the existence of the State of Chitral. The mosque was built on the orders of His Highness Shuja ul-Mulk in 1924.

See also
List of mosques in Pakistan
Shuja ul-Mulk
Chitral Fort
Chitral (princely state)

References

Mosques in Khyber Pakhtunkhwa
Mosques completed in 1922
Chitral
Mughal mosques